Ludwig Stroh (2 February 1910 – 6 July 1990) was an Austrian footballer who played for RC Strasbourg, FC Basel and FC Rouen in the 1930s. He played as midfielder. 

Stroh joined Basel's first team from RC Strasbourg in the summer of 1935 for their 1935–36 season. He played his domestic league debut for the club in the away game on 25 August as Basel were defeated 2–3 by St. Gallen.

While playing his season for Basel, Stroh played a total of 11 games for the club. Seven of these games were in the Nationalliga, one was in the Swiss Cup and three other games were friendly games.

After his time in Switzerland Stroh returned to France and continued his playing career by FC Rouen.

References

Sources
 Rotblau: Jahrbuch Saison 2017/2018. Publisher: FC Basel Marketing AG. 
 Die ersten 125 Jahre. Publisher: Josef Zindel im Friedrich Reinhardt Verlag, Basel. 
 Verein "Basler Fussballarchiv" Homepage

1910 births
1990 deaths
FC Basel players
Austrian footballers
Association football midfielders